Lucknow Raipur Garib Rath Express is a Superfast Express train of the Garib Rath series belonging to Indian Railways - North Eastern Railway zone that runs between Lucknow NE and Raipur Junction in India.

It operates as train number 12535 from Lucknow NE to Raipur Junction and as train number 12536 in the reverse direction serving the states of Uttar Pradesh, Madhya Pradesh & Chhattisgarh.

It is part of the Garib Rath Express series launched by the former railway minister of India, Laloo Prasad Yadav .

Coaches
The train has 10 AC 3 tier & 2 End on Generator Coaches . It does not carry a Pantry car coach.

Service

Routeing

Traction
This train is hauled by Ghaziabad based WAP 5 locomotive from Raipur to Lucknow.

References

External links

Passenger trains originating from Lucknow
Transport in Raipur, Chhattisgarh
Garib Rath Express trains
Rail transport in Madhya Pradesh
Rail transport in Chhattisgarh
Railway services introduced in 2008